On the evening of 17 October 2022, a Su-34 military aircraft crashed into an apartment building in Yeysk, Krasnodar Krai, Russia.

A large fireball was visible upon impact, causing a fire in the nine-story building, killing 15 people.

Background 
The disaster occurred against the backdrop of the 2022 Russian invasion of Ukraine. Su-34 aircraft were used by Russia in the war with Ukraine. However, there was no information in open sources about the use of bombers from the air base in Yeysk.

However, journalists noted that the Su-34 is not in service with the Russian Navy and that it was not previously reported in open sources that it was used to train pilots of naval aviation. But journalists noted that the training complex in Yeysk was also used to train other military pilots.

Accident 
The Russian Ministry of Defence reported that the Su-34 fighter-bomber crashed while climbing to perform a training flight. The pilots ejected. They reported that the cause of the crash was the ignition of one of the engines during takeoff. The ministry said fuel caught fire at the crash site.

Information about the crash of the Su-34 aircraft into a multi-storey residential building was received by the Ministry of Emergency Situations at 18:25; the incident occurred on the intersection of Krasnaya (Red) Street and Kommunisticheskaya (Communist) Street.

Fire 
The fire damaged at least 17 apartments in the building, according to the Governor of Krasnodar Krai, Veniamin Kondratyev. At the same time, the city's duty dispatch service said that the fire damaged at least 45 apartments. According to the service, the fire completely engulfed one of the entrances, where there was a collapse of the floors from the ninth to the fifth. At the same time, the regional Ministry of Emergency Situations reported that apartments from the first to the fifth floors caught fire after the crash.

At about 20:40 local time, the fire was contained and the remnants of the aircraft were extinguished.

Victims 
In the first few hours, there was no accurate information on the victims, since the operational services of the city could not conduct reconnaissance of the burning building due to a strong fire and the continuing danger of explosions.

 15 dead and 26 injured are known. Families are assisted by 40 psychologists from Krasnodar and Yeysk.

Analysis 
According to Ukrainian aviation expert Valery Romanenko, "if the flight had been combat, half of the house would not have been there." He acknowledged the presence of small explosions that were heard after the plane crashed, but suggested that these were either cartridges for a 30-mm cannon or training projectiles. However, he noted the absence of major explosions, despite the fact that the aircraft is capable of taking up to eight tons of bombs.

Investigation 
According to the Telegram channel of the Investigative Committee of Russia, a criminal case has been opened on the fact of the crash of the Su-34 aircraft in Yeysk. The department noted that criminologists of the central office of the department were sent to the scene of the incident, the circumstances and causes of the incident are being established.

See also 
 2022 Irkutsk military aircraft crash, a similar incident, in which a military plane crashed into a residential building, six days after the crash in Yeysk.
 1997 Irkutsk Antonov An-124 crash, another Russian military aircraft that crashed into a residential area
 El Al Flight 1862, a cargo plane that crashed into an apartment building in the Netherlands in similar circumstances
 List of aircraft accidents and incidents by number of ground fatalities

References

Aviation accidents and incidents in Russia in 2022
Aviation accidents and incidents in 2022
October 2022 events in Russia
Aviation accidents and incidents in Russia
Accidents and incidents involving military aircraft
Residential building fires
History of Krasnodar Krai